The 2013 King's Cup was an international football competition, the 42nd edition of the tournament. It was a two-round knockout tournament, with all matches held at the 700th Anniversary Stadium in Chiang Mai, Thailand between 23 January and 26 January. This edition features the hosts Thailand and three invited teams (Sweden, Finland and North Korea). In the final Sweden defeated Finland 3–0 to win the tournament.

Going into the tournament, North Korea were unofficial football world champions. In winning their semi-final, Sweden took the title and successfully defended it in the final.

Squads

Venue

Bracket

Matches 
All times are local (UTC+7)

Semi-finals

Third place match

3rd Place shared

Final

Winner

References 

2013
Kings